Eardrum, a thin membrane that separates the external ear from the middle ear.

Eardrum may also refer to:

 Eardrum (album), an album by Talib Kweli
 Eardrum Records, a record label